Robat Sefid (also Romanized as Robāţ Sefīd; also known as Gardaneh-ye Robāţ Sefīd, Ribāt-i-Sefīd, Robāţ-e Khākestarī, and Robāţ-e Sefīd) is a village in Piveh Zhan Rural District, Ahmadabad District, Mashhad County, Razavi Khorasan Province, Iran. At the 2006 census, its population was 1,234, in 329 families.

References 

Populated places in Mashhad County